The 2017–18 Ligue 1 season was RC Strasbourg Alsace's first season in the top flight of French football since their relegation in the 2007–08 season.

The club finished 15th, escaping relegation on the final day.

Players

First team squad

Competitions

Ligue 1

League table

Results summary

Results by round

Coupe de France

References

RC Strasbourg Alsace seasons
Strasbourg